Secondary Highway 514, commonly referred to as Highway 514, was a secondary highway in the Canadian province of Ontario. It was used on two separate routes from the 1950s to the 1990s:
 Secondary Highway 514 (1956–1972), became Muskoka Road 8
 Secondary Highway 514 (1975–1998), became Renfrew Road 514